A number of studies have found that human biology can be linked with political orientation. This means that an individual's biology may predispose them to a particular political orientation and ideology. Many of the studies linking biology to politics remain controversial and unrepeated.

Studies have found that subjects with right-wing, or conservative in the United States, political views have larger amygdalae and are more sensitive to disgust. Those with left-wing, or liberal in the United States, political views have larger volume of grey matter in the anterior cingulate cortex and are more attentive to incongruent information. Conservatives have a stronger sympathetic nervous system response to threatening images and are more sensitive to threatening facial expressions. 

Genetic factors account for at least some of the variation of political views. From the perspective of evolutionary psychology, conflicts regarding redistribution of wealth may have been common in the ancestral environment and humans may have developed psychological mechanisms for judging their own chances of succeeding in such conflicts. These mechanisms affect political views.

Brain studies

A 2011 study by cognitive neuroscientist Ryota Kanai at University College London found structural brain differences between subjects of different political orientation in a convenience sample of students at the same college. The researchers performed MRI scans on the brains of 90 volunteer students who had indicated their political orientation on a five-point scale ranging from "very liberal" to "very conservative".

Students who reported more conservative political views were found to have larger amygdala, a structure in the temporal lobes whose primary function is in the formation, consolidation and processing of memory, as well as positive and negative conditioning (emotional learning). The amygdala is responsible for important roles in social interaction, such as the recognition of emotional cues in facial expressions and the monitoring of personal space, with larger amygdalae correlating with larger and more complex social networks. It is also postulated to play a role in threat detection, including modulation of fear and aggression to perceived threats. Conservative students were also found to have greater volume of gray matter in the left insula and the right entorhinal cortex. There is evidence that conservatives are more sensitive to disgust and one role of the insula is in the modulation of social emotions, such as the feeling of disgust to specific sights, smells and norm violations.

Students who reported more liberal political views were found to have a larger volume of grey matter in the anterior cingulate cortex, a structure of the brain associated with emotional awareness and the emotional processing of pain. The anterior cingulate cortex becomes active in situations of uncertainty, and is postulated to play a role in error detection, such as the monitoring and processing of conflicting stimuli or information.

The authors concluded, "Although our data do not determine whether these regions play a causal role in the formation of political attitudes, they converge with previous work to suggest a possible link between brain structure and psychological mechanisms that mediate political attitudes." In an interview with LiveScience, Ryota Kanai said, "It's very unlikely that actual political orientation is directly encoded in these brain regions", and that "more work is needed to determine how these brain structures mediate the formation of political attitude." Kanai and colleagues added that it is necessary to conduct a longitudinal study to determine whether the changes in brain structure that we observed lead to changes in political behavior or whether political attitudes and behavior instead result in changes of brain structure.

Functional differences

Psychometrics

Various studies suggest measurable differences in the psychological traits of liberals and conservatives. Conservatives are more likely to report larger social networks, greater happiness and self-esteem than liberals, are more reactive to perceived threats and more likely to interpret ambiguous facial expressions as threatening. Liberals are more likely to report greater emotional distress, relationship dissatisfaction and experiential hardship than conservatives, and show more openness to experience as well as greater tolerance for uncertainty and disorder.

Behavioral studies

A study by scientists at New York University and the University of California, Los Angeles, found differences in how self-described liberal and conservative research participants responded to changes in patterns. Participants were asked to tap a keyboard when the letter "M" appeared on a computer monitor and to refrain from tapping when they saw a "W". The letter "M" appeared four times more frequently than "W", conditioning participants to press the keyboard when a letter appears. Liberal participants made fewer mistakes than conservatives during testing and their electroencephalograph readings showed more activity in the anterior cingulate cortex, the part of the brain that deals with conflicting information, during the experiment, suggesting that they were better able to detect conflicts in established patterns. The lead author of the study, David Amodio, warned against concluding that a particular political orientation is superior. He said: "The tendency of conservatives to block distracting information could be a good thing depending on the situation." A 2017 study both replicated the original study and also found that conservatives performed better in a task in which choosing the simple strategy was the more optimal solution; while both liberals and conservatives started the task attempting the more complex but less effective strategy, conservatives switched to the simple strategy more quickly than liberals.

A study of subjects' reported level of disgust linked to various scenarios showed that people who scored highly on the "disgust sensitivity" scale held more politically conservative views, which some researchers believe could be partially explained by personality traits. However, the findings of a 2019 study suggest that sensitivity to disgust among conservatives varies according to the elicitors used, and that using an elicitor-unspecific scale caused the differences in sensitivity to disappear between those of different political orientations.

A 2018 study in the United States looking at levels of cognitive reflection (the tendency to favour analytic reasoning over intuitive or "gut" responses) found that Trump voters had lower levels of cognitive reflection than Clinton voters or third-party voters, however this effect was mostly driven by Democrats who voted for Trump, while amongst Republicans, Clinton and Trump voters had more similar levels of cognitive reflection. Republicans who voted for third-party candidates or those who identified as libertarian had the highest levels of cognitive reflection.

Physiology

People with right-wing views had greater skin conductance response, indicating greater sympathetic nervous system response, to threatening images than those with left-wing views in one study. There was no difference for positive or neutral images. Holding right-wing views was also associated with a stronger startle reflex as measured by strength of eyeblink in response to unexpected noise. Subsequent studies with substantially greater statistical power have failed to replicate these effects.

In an fMRI study published in Social Neuroscience, three different patterns of brain activation were found to correlate with individualism, conservatism, and radicalism. In general, fMRI responses in several portions of the brain have been linked to viewing of the faces of well-known politicians. Others believe that determining political affiliation from fMRI data is overreaching.

Genetic studies

Heritability
Heritability compares differences in genetic factors in individuals to the total variance of observable characteristics ("phenotypes") in a population, to determine the heritability coefficient. Factors including genetics, environment and random chance can all contribute to the variation in individuals' phenotypes.

The use of twin studies assumes the elimination of non-genetic differences by finding the statistical differences between monozygotic (identical) twins, which have almost the same genes, and dizygotic (fraternal) twins. The similarity of the environment in which twins are reared has been questioned.

A twin study in 2005 by Alford et al examined the attitudes regarding 28 different political issues such as capitalism, unions, X-rated movies, abortion, school prayer, divorce, property taxes, and the draft. Twins were asked if they agreed or disagreed or were uncertain about each issue. Genetic factors accounted for 53% of the variance of an overall score. However, self-identification as Republican and Democrat had a much lower heritability of 14%. It is worthwhile to note that identical twins correlated in opinion at a rate of 0.66 while fraternal twins correlated in opinion by 0.44. This likely occurs because identical twins share 100% of their DNA while fraternal twins share on average only 50% of their DNA. However, Jonathan Kaplan argued that the role of individual genes is often extremely small due to many human physical traits being polygenic and may be overstated, observing that the study by Alford et al made a case for the role of the 5-HTTLPR region being involved in numerous psychological and personality traits, yet Border et al (2019) found that multiple associations with 5-HTTLPR were spurious and underpowered.

Jost et al. wrote in a 2011 review that "Many studies involving quite diverse samples and methods suggest that political and religious views reflect a reasonably strong genetic basis, but this does not mean that ideological proclivities are unaffected by personal experiences or environmental factors."

Gene association studies
A study was preformed on 12,000 twin pairs started on 2015 mainly to understand the genetic influences on political ideologies, It was then explained that The lack of integration of the social and genetic paradigms of ideology could be attributed to five primary source.

Firstly, evidence for the majority of findings that genes have some role in ideological formation or transmission has relied on three samples. Most of the subjects were ascertained in the 1980's and early 1990's. With the exception of the Minnesota twins reared apart studies (Bouchard et al. 1990), most papers that explored the genetic influences on political attitudes relied on the Eaves and Martin samples. Moreover, The operational definition of ideology is understood to refer to the grouping of attitudes to form some type of coherent political framework or worldview, which can then be used to guide behavior. Most empirical explorations of ideological beliefs rely on self-identification measures of liberalism and conservatism rather than the more psychometrically designed attitude inventory such as a WP scale.

Thirdly, The majority of genetically informed studies of ideology have relied on quantitative models of twins, adoptees and kinships. Behavior genetic approaches have also inspired philosophical objections due to the belief that behavioral differences are entirely socialized. Several publications in political science have begun to explicate the theoretical and empirical justification for including gene-environment interplay. Which also showed in recent study Hatemi et al's (2010) extended kinship analyses found no special twin environments existed for political opinions. Littvay and Smith (2012) found explicit differences in rearing had little influence on the heritability of attitudes or ideology.

Lastly the fourth and fifth sources were apparent when Critics have focused on whether political ideologies and attitudes are merely manifestations of personality. Verhulst and colleagues challenge this view by decomposing the variance between personality traits and ideologies. They find that the majority of genetic variance remained unique to attitudes and ideologies, and that changes in personality over time did not change attitudes. Finally  Studies of heritability of political attitudes have largely relied on estimates of genetic variance at a latent level, and have remained agnostic as to the identity of the specific genetic variants involved. Some have argued that without specific genetic and neurobiological systems to focus on, integrating genetic research into testable hypotheses remains abstract.

The studied suggests that 30-60% of variance in social and political attitudes can be explained by genetic influences. Findings have not been widely accepted or incorporated into dominant paradigms that explain the etiology of political ideology. We present results from original analyses of a combined sample of over 12,000 twins pairs.[50]

"A Genome-Wide Analysis of Liberal and Conservative Political Attitudes" by Peter K. Hatemi et al. traces DNA research involving 13,000 subjects. The study identifies several genes potentially connected with political ideology.

Evolutionary psychology
From an evolutionary psychology perspective, conflicts regarding redistribution of wealth may have been a recurrent issue in the ancestral environment. Humans may therefore have developed psychological mechanisms for judging their chance of succeeding in such conflicts which will affect their political views. For males, physical strength may have been an important factor in deciding the outcome of such conflicts. Therefore, a prediction is that males that have high physical strength and low socioeconomic status (SES) will support redistribution while males that have both high SES and high physical strength will oppose redistribution. Cross-cultural research found this to be the case; for females, their physical strength had no influence on their political views which was as expected since females rarely have physical strength above that of the average male. A study on political attitudes among Hollywood actors found that, while the actors were generally more left-leaning, male actors with great physical strength were more likely to support the Republican stance on foreign issues and foreign military interventions.

An alternative evolutionary explanation for political diversity is that it is a polymorphism, like those of gender and blood type, resulting from frequency-dependent selection.  Tim Dean has suggested that we live in such a moral ecosystem whereby the advantage gained by having any one particular moral strategy diminishes as it becomes very common, causing evolution to produce individuals with a diversity of moral strategies. Alford et al posit that political variation could offer groups different strategies of solving problems, thus variation is maintained by virtue of being adaptive at the group level.

See also
 Political spectrum
 Biology and political science
 Biological determinism
 Brain types
 Genopolitics
 Neuropolitics
 Replication crisis

References

Further reading

 "Some Politics May Be Etched in the Genes". The New York Times.
 "Political Views Reflected in Brain Structure". ABC News
 "Liberals and conservatives don’t just vote differently. They think differently." The Washington Post
 "Body politic. The genetics of politics. Slowly, and in some quarters grudgingly, the influence of genes in shaping political outlook and behaviour is being recognised". The Economist, October 6, 2012.

External links
 Conservative Left Brain, Liberal Right Brain

 
Cognitive neuroscience
Conservatism in the United States
Liberalism in the United States
Political science
Political spectrum